The GoodTimesKid is a 2005 American minimalist comedy/drama film starring Sara Diaz and Azazel Jacobs. Jacobs also directed the film. The DVD is distributed by Benten Films.

Plot
The story follows two men, both named Rodolfo Cano, whose lives intersect when one Rodolfo volunteers to join the Army. Complicating the picture is Diaz, played by Sara Diaz, who comes between the two Rodolfos.

Production
The movie was shot in Echo Park, Los Angeles and filmed entirely on film left over from a larger budget picture.

Reception
The GoodTimesKid garnered generally positive reviews and currently holds a 78% (positive) rating on rottentomatoes based on 9 reviews.

References

External links

2005 films
American comedy-drama films
Films shot in Los Angeles
American independent films
2005 comedy-drama films
2005 comedy films
2005 drama films
2005 independent films
2000s English-language films
2000s American films